The First 40 Years is a 1979 television special by American singer Frank Sinatra on his 40th anniversary in show business.

Track listing
"My Way" - 2:13
"If I Could Be with You" - 0:13
"Ciribiribin" - 0:30
"The Two O'Clock Jump" - 2:04
"You Make Me Feel So Young" - 0:09
"In My Merry Oldsmobile" [Background Piano] - 1:30
"Young at Heart" - 0:22
"I'm Getting Sentimental Over You" - 0:24
"Over There" - 0:11
"Take Me out of the Ballgame" - 0:19
"Holiday for Strings" - 2:29
"New York, New York" - 0:22
"My Kind of Town" - 1:09
"I Left My Heart in San Francisco" - 1:32
"At Long Last Love" - 0:14
"Just One of Those Things - 0:11
"The Candy Man" - 0:26
"The Lady Is a Tramp" - 2:38
"Too Marvelous for Words" - 0:10
"My Way" - 2:55
"Bullfight Music" - 0:17
"One for My Baby (And One More for the Road)" - 0:19
"Good Night Sweetheart" - 0:28
"Theme from New York, New York" - 3:19
"It Was a Very Good Year" - 4:19
"The Best Is Yet to Come" - 2:58
"I've Got You Under My Skin" - 3:33
"I've Got the World on a String" - 2:07
"Instrumental Intro" - 0:10
"All the Way" - 0:13
"Happy Birthday" - 0:28
"Put Your Dreams Away (For Another Day)"

Frank Sinatra television specials
1970s American television specials
1979 television specials
2002 video albums